The 1934 Gent–Wevelgem was the inaugural edition of the Gent–Wevelgem cycle race and was held on 9 September 1934. The race started in Ghent and finished in Wevelgem.

General classification

References

Gent–Wevelgem
1934 in road cycling
1934 in Belgian sport
September 1934 sports events